The Archivo General de la Nación (Spanish for "General Archive of the Nation"; abbreviated AGN) is charged by the Mexican state to "be the governing body of the national archives and the central consultative entity of the Federal Executive." The writer Edmundo O'Gorman was its general director from 1938 until 1952. It is considered the most important among its class in the Americas and one of the most important in the entire world.

Since 1980, the archives have been housed in the Palacio de Lecumberri in Mexico City, a former prison.

See also 
 List of national archives

External links

—Official Archivo General de la Nación website

Archives in Mexico
Cultural heritage of Mexico
Mexico
Government agencies of Mexico
History museums in Mexico
Mexican culture
Venustiano Carranza, Mexico City